Below is a list of athletes who competed in both the Summer and Winter Olympics, as of the end of the 2020 Summer Olympics.

Prior to the 1924 Winter Olympics, the winter sports of Figure skating and Ice hockey had been contested in the Summer Olympics. The creation of the first winter games allowed for many athletes of the era to compete in both sets of games in the same discipline, and on this page these athletes are listed below the main list. The Russian athlete Nikolai Panin is unique in having competed in both a summer sport (shooting in 1912) and a winter sport (figure skating in 1908) but only competing at the Summer Olympics.

Among these athletes, the most-occurring combination is bobsledding and athletics, followed by cycling and speed skating. Other events competed in by Summer and Winter Olympians include fencing, track and field, sailing, ski jumping, and equestrian events. Only six of the 139 athletes won medals in both the Summer or Winter Olympics. 

Eddie Eagan and Gillis Grafström were the only two athletes to win gold medals in both the Summer and Winter Olympics.  Grafström has the further distinction of being the only person to have won an individual gold medal in both the Summer (1920) and Winter Olympics (1924, 1928), meanwhile Eagan remains the only athlete to have managed the feat in different disciplines. Some of the Olympians competed in both sets of games over a span of different decades.

Athletes who competed in both the Summer and Winter Olympics in different sports

Athletes who competed in both the Summer and Winter Olympics in the same sport

Notes

References

Lists of Olympic competitors